SMIS is a four-letter abbreviation that may refer to:

Systems
 Structures Management Information System - a Highways Agency (UK) system for inventory and defect management of the structures.
 Strategic Management Information Systems

Standards
 Storage Management Initiative - Specification

Educational institutions
 St. Mary's International School
 St. Michael's International School